Whitman National Forest was established in Oregon on July 1, 1908 with  from part of Blue Mountains National Forest. On June 20, 1920 part of Minam National Forest was added. In 1954 it was administratively combined with Wallowa National Forest to make Wallowa–Whitman National Forest. In descending order of forest land area, Whitman National Forest is located in parts of Baker, Union, Grant, Wallowa, Umatilla, and Malheur counties. There are local ranger district offices in Baker City, Halfway, and Unity. Its administrative headquarters are in Baker City, as part of the Wallowa-Whitman National Forest.

References

External links
Forest History Society
Listing of the National Forests of the United States and Their Dates (from the Forest History Society website) Text from Davis, Richard C., ed. Encyclopedia of American Forest and Conservation History. New York: Macmillan Publishing Company for the Forest History Society, 1983. Vol. II, pp. 743–788.

Former National Forests of Oregon
1908 establishments in Oregon
Protected areas established in 1908